Curtitoma hebes is a species of sea snail, a marine gastropod mollusk in the family Mangeliidae.

Description
The length of the shell varies between 6 mm and 9 mm.

(Original description) The shell has a short-fusiform or subovate shape, with a short, blunt spire, and with five or six convex, but slightly angled or carinated whorls, which have a slightly flattened subsutural band. The suture is impressed and slightly channelled. The sculpture shows numerous small, regular, raised, spiral ridges, separated by wider grooves. Usually one, just below the subsutural band, is stronger and more raised, forming a slight carina. On the subsutural band they are faint, or indistinct. The spiral lines are often decussated, more or less, by equally slender, transverse, raised riblets, coincident with the lines of growth, but not uniformly present. These may produce a slightly cancellated structure, on all the whorls, and extend as curved riblets, across the subsutural band. The whorls of the protoconch are not preserved in any of the holotype specimens. The aperture is short and narrow-ovate. The outer lip is expanded below the suture, then regularly rounded and thin. The posterior sinus is broad and shallow. The straight siphonal canal is very short and rather broad. The columella is sigmoid and regularly incurved. The epidermis is thin and greenish
white.

Distribution
This species is amphiboreal and occurs in the Northwest Atlantic Ocean and the Gulf of Maine; also reported from the Sea of Japan; found at depths between 100 m and 1320 m.

References

 Verrill, A.E. (1880) Notice on recent additions to the marine Invertebrata of the northeastern coast of America, with descriptions of new genera and species and critical remarks on others. Proceedings of the United States National Museum, 3: 356–405
 Brunel, P.; Bosse, L.; Lamarche, G. (1998). Catalogue of the marine invertebrates of the estuary and Gulf of St. Lawrence. Canadian Special Publication of Fisheries and Aquatic Sciences, 126. 405 p.

External links
  Tucker, J.K. 2004 Catalog of recent and fossil turrids (Mollusca: Gastropoda). Zootaxa 682: 1–1295.
 
 Gulbin, Vladimir V. "Review of the Shell-bearing Gastropods in the Russian Waters of the East Sea (Sea of Japan). III. Caenogastropoda: Neogastropoda." The Korean Journal of Malacology 25.1 (2009): 51–70

hebes
Gastropods described in 1880